Purdie is a surname and may refer to:

 Alexander Purdie, Colonial Williamsburg printer, publisher, merchant
 Alexander Callender Purdie (1824–1899), New Zealand naturalist
 Bernard Purdie (born 1939), American session drummer
 Bernard Purdie (footballer) (born 1949), Welsh footballer
 Brad Purdie (born 1972), Canadian ice hockey player
 Ethel Ayres Purdie (1874 - 1923), British accountant and suffragist
 Henry Augustus Purdie (1840–1911), American naturalist
 Jock Purdie (1918–1988), English footballer
 Justin Purdie (born 1980), Samoan rugby union player
 Rob Purdie (born 1982), English footballer
 Tom Purdie (1854–1929), Scottish footballer who played for Hearts
Russell Purdie (1967-current)American, intern under 
Pat Buchanan American conservative columnist and Communications Director for USA President 
Ronald Reagan.

See also
 Purdey (disambiguation)
 Purdy (disambiguation)